The 1993 Supercopa Libertadores was the sixth season of the Supercopa Libertadores, a club football tournament for past Copa Libertadores winners. The tournament was won by São Paulo, who beat Flamengo 5–4 in a penalty shootout after a 4–4 aggregate draw in the final.

First round
The matches were played from 6 October to 13 October.

|}

Quarter finals
The matches were played from 20 October to 27 October.

|}

Semi-finals
The matches were played from 3 November to 10 November.

|}

Final

First leg

Second leg

See also
1993 Copa Libertadores

External links
RSSSF

Supercopa Libertadores
2